Hans Kamstrup Vogt (1 June 1903 – 25 September 1986) was a Norwegian linguist who specialized in the Caucasian languages, especially Georgian.  He also did significant early work on the Kalispel language and produced an interesting dictionary of the Ubykh language.

He was a member of the Norwegian Academy of Science and Letters since 1937, the Royal Danish Academy of Sciences and Letters from 1957 and of the Norwegian Academy for Language and Literature from 1971. He was an honorary member of the Linguistic Society of America, the Societas Caucasologica Europaea and the Georgian Academy of Languages. He held an honorary degree at the Tbilisi State University and won the Nansen Medal in 1967. He was decorated as a Commander of the Order of St. Olav (1966) and Chevalier of the Legion of Honour.

Politically he was a member of the organization Mot Dag from 1926 to 1936.

References

1903 births
1986 deaths
People from Fredrikstad
Norwegian expatriates in France
Linguists from Norway
Kartvelian studies scholars
Ubykh language
Academic staff of the University of Oslo
Rectors of the University of Oslo
Members of the Norwegian Academy
Members of the Norwegian Academy of Science and Letters
Members of the Royal Danish Academy of Sciences and Letters
Chevaliers of the Légion d'honneur
Mot Dag
Linguists of Salishan languages
20th-century linguists